Jamaica is an island country in the Caribbean. The country had a population of 2,818,596 in 2022, the fourth largest in the region.

Jamaica's annual population growth rate stood at 0.08% in 2022. As of 2011, 92.1% of the population are Afro-Jamaicans, 6.1% mixed and 0,8% Indian. 68.9% of Jamaicans were Christians in 2011, predominantly Protestant.

Population
The proportion of children below the age of 15 in 2010 was 29%, 63.1% was between 15 and 65 years of age, while 7.8% was 65 years or older

Structure of the population

Structure of the population (4 April 2011) (Census):

Vital statistics

Life expectancy at birth

Source: UN World Population Prospects

Other sources of demographic statistics 
Demographic statistics below are based on the 2022 World Population Review.

One birth every 12 minutes	
One death every 23 minutes	
One net migrant every 46 minutes	
Net gain of one person every 45 minutes

The following demographic statistics are from The World Factbook by the CIA, unless otherwise referenced.

Population
2,818,596 (2022 est.)
2,990,561 (July 2017)

Age structure
0-14 years: 25.2% (male 360,199/female 347,436)
15-24 years: 17.95% (male 255,102/female 248,927)
25-54 years: 38.06% (male 518,583/female 550,410)
55-64 years: 9.63% (male 133,890/female 136,442)
65 years and over: 9.17% (2020 est.) (male 121,969/female 135,612)

Birth rate
15.91 births/1,000 population (2022 est.) Country comparison to the world: 103rd

Death rate
7.43 deaths/1,000 population (2022 est.) Country comparison to the world: 108th

Total fertility rate
2.06 children born/woman (2022 est.) Country comparison to the world: 98th

Population growth rate 
0.08% (2022 est.) Country comparison to the world: 189th
0.68% (2017)

Net migration rate
-7.7 migrant(s)/1,000 population (2022 est.) Country comparison to the world: 219th
-4.3 migrant(s)/1,000 population

Median age
total: 29.4 years. Country comparison to the world: 131st
male: 28.6 years
female: 30.1 years (2020 est.)

Mother's mean age at first birth
21.2 years (2008 est.)
note: median age at first birth among women 25–29

Urbanization

urban population: 57% of total population (2022)
rate of urbanisation: 0.79% annual rate of change (2020–25 est.)

Education expenditures
5.4% of GDP (2020) Country comparison to the world: 43rd

Life expectancy at birth
total population: 75.75 years. Country comparison to the world: 116th
male: 73.98 years
female: 77.6 years (2022 est.)

Infant mortality rate
Total: 13.37 deaths/1,000 live births
Male: 13.93 deaths/1,000 live births
Female: 12.78 deaths/1,000 live births (2015 est.)

Literacy
definition: age 15 and over has ever attended school
total population: 88.7%
male: 84%
female: 93.1% (2015)

School life expectancy (primary to tertiary education)
total: 12 years
male: 11 years
female: 13 years (2015)

Unemployment, youth ages 15–24
total: 20.6%
male: 16.8%
female: 25.4% (2019 est.)

Languages
English, Jamaican Patois

Religion
Protestant 64.8% (includes Seventh Day Adventist 12.0%, Pentecostal 11.0%, Other Church of God 9.2%, New Testament Church of God 7.2%, Baptist 6.7%, Church of God in Jamaica 4.8%, Church of God of Prophecy 4.5%, Anglican 2.8%, United Church 2.1%, Methodist 1.6%, Revived 1.4%, Brethren 0.9%, and Moravian 0.7%), Roman Catholic 2.2%, Jehovah's Witness 1.9%, Rastafarian 1.1%, other 6.5%, none 21.3%, unspecified 2.3% (2011 est.)

Ethnic groups
Black 92.1%, mixed 6.1%, East Indian 0.8%, other 0.4%, unspecified 0.7% (2011 est.)

Nationality
Noun: Jamaican(s)
Adjective: Jamaican

See also
 Afro-Jamaican
 List of cities and towns in Jamaica

References

External links
CIA World Factbook – Jamaica
Statistics Institute of Jamaica – Government agency responsible for census and statistical mapping

 
Society of Jamaica